Museo de la Exploración Rudolph Amandus Philippi (Spanish for Museum of the Exploration Rudolph Amandus Philippi) is a museum in Valdivia run by Austral University of Chile. The exhibitions at the museum deals with the exploration of southern Chile, specially those made by the German naturalist Rodolfo Amando Philippi.

Museums in Los Ríos Region
Museo de la Exploración Rudolph Amandus Philippi
University museums in Chile
Natural history museums in Chile
Museums established in 2006
Museo de la Exploración Rudolph Amandus Philippi
Museo de la Exploración Rudolph Amandus Philippi
German-Chilean_architecture